Ramón Lavín (23 March 1962 – 3 August 1999) was a Spanish swimmer who competed in the 1980 Summer Olympics.

References

1962 births
1999 deaths
Spanish male freestyle swimmers
Olympic swimmers of Spain
Swimmers at the 1980 Summer Olympics